Ethel Miller Terrell (February 28, 1926March 1, 1994) was a Michigan politician.

Early life
Terrell was born on February 28, 1926, in Uniontown, Alabama, to parents Reverend Julis and Alberta Miller.

Education
Terrell attended the Art Center Music School of Detroit and Wayne County Community College. Terrell earned a degree from Baptist Training Union. Terrell received an honorary Doctor of Law degree from Urban Baptist College in Detroit.

Career
In 1962, Terrell was a candidate in the Democratic primary for the position of delegate to the Michigan state constitutional convention representing the 3rd Senatorial District. In 1964, Terrell was a delegate to Democratic National Convention from Michigan. In 1968, Terrell was elected the Highland Park city council, becoming the first black woman city council member in Michigan and the first woman city council member in Highland Park. On November 7, 1978, Terrell was elected to the Michigan House of Representatives where she represented the 9th district from January 10, 1979, to 1990. She was defeated in the primary for the same position in 1990. In 1988, Terrell unsuccessfully ran in the primary for the position of Michigan state senator representing the 2nd district.

Personal life
Terrell was married to Rohne. She was widowed around 1985. Terrell was Baptist.

Death
Terrell died on March 1, 1994, in Detroit. Her last residence was Highland Park, Michigan.

References

1926 births
1994 deaths
Baptists from Michigan
People from Uniontown, Alabama
People from Highland Park, Michigan
Wayne County Community College District alumni
Michigan city council members
Women city councillors in Michigan
Women state legislators in Michigan
African-American women in politics
African-American state legislators in Michigan
Democratic Party members of the Michigan House of Representatives
20th-century African-American women
20th-century African-American politicians
20th-century American women politicians
20th-century American politicians
African-American city council members in Michigan
20th-century Baptists